Biddi-luxe! is the debut album of The Lascivious Biddies.

Track listing
 "Rhode Island (a.k.a. Coney Island)"
 "It's Only a Paper Moon"
 "Little D's Daydream"
 "Ethel and Esther"
 "I'd Rather"
 "Alice"
 "Headed South"
 "Prairie Song"
 "Idle Boy"
 "Ladies Home Auxiliary"
 "Moon River"
 "Head Over Heels"
 "The Anthem"

References

2002 debut albums
Lascivious Biddies albums